Aweil Eest County, is a county in South Sudan.

Location
The county is located in the eastern part of Northern Bahr el Ghazal state, in northern South Sudan, close to the border with the Republic of Sudan. It is bordered by South Darfur State to the north, Abyei Region to the northeast, Twic County in Warrap State to the east, Gogrial West County, also in Warrap State, to the southeast, Aweil South County to the south, Aweil West County to the southwest and Aweil North County to the northwest. it has eight administrative payams Baac, Yargot, Madhol, Malual baai, Mangar tong, Mayom wel, Mangok and Wunlang

The coordinates of the county are: 9° 0' 0.00"N, 27° 36' 0.00"E (Latitude: 9.0000; Longitude: 27.6000).
Other Main towns are Malualkon, Madhol, Warawar, Malualbaai, Akuemkou and Yargot

Population
The 2008 Sudanese census estimated the population of Torit County at approximately 309,920 Although these results were disputed by the South Sudanese authorities, they are the only recent figures available and form a basis on which newer population surveys can be based.

Administrative divisions
Aweil East County is made up of seven (8) payams (sub-counties), namely:

 Wunlang Payam which includes Aweilic boma of which marketing is in Ajaac Market.
 Baac Payam
 Mangok Payam
 Madhol Payam
 Malualbaai Payam
 Mangartong Payam
 Yargot Payam
Mayom Wel

References

External links
Map of The Counties of South Sudan
2008 South Sudanese District Population Map

Counties of South Sudan
Northern Bahr el Ghazal
Bahr el Ghazal